Fengping or , may refer to:

 Fengping, Lianyuan, a town in Lianyuan, Hunan, China.

 Fengping, Mangshi, a town in Mangshi, Yunnan, China.